Dreamcar (stylized as DREAMCAR) is an American new wave supergroup from Los Angeles, California.

Background and musical style
When news first broke of Davey Havok working with No Doubt members, many believed he would be replacing Gwen Stefani as the singer of that band. In an interview, Havok clarified that this was not the case. "I'm not singing for No Doubt," he said. He did admit that the band "have a lot of great songs. We have songs that are fully complete. And, it's just a great time. It's really fun. I think people will really like it." Havok also stated the band's overall style has an "'80s vibe".

Speaking to Billboard back in May 2016, drummer Adrian Young said of Dreamcar, "It doesn’t sound like anything, it actually doesn’t sound like AFI or No Doubt. And sometimes I'm not objective enough to really understand it. And I ask my wife or friends, I play them a snippet and I go, 'Does this sound like either one of these bands?' And they’re like, 'No.' And I think that's a good thing."

Tony Kanal was "beyond stoked for people to hear" the debut record from his new project, Dreamcar, which features his No Doubt bandmates, Young and Tom Dumont, as well as AFI frontman Havok. "I can't stop listening to it, so that's always a good sign for me," he said, while noting the band has been in the "final stages" of wrapping up the album. "When I've worked on something that I can't stop listening to—and that I want to get in my car and listen to—it always makes me feel really good. You have this excitement to share it with everybody."
Although he's hesitant to give specifics as to what Dreamcar sounds like, he does allow the album is "very inspired by all the '80s stuff that we love. I would definitely say it's a rock record," and says the entire music-making process was very organic and unforced. "There was never really a conversation about what type of music we were making," he says. "We were just making music, and it just worked."

Dreamcar's first single "Kill for Candy" premiered on March 2, 2017. A video for the song was released on April 3, 2017. Their self-titled debut album was released on May 12, 2017.

Band members
Davey Havok – lead vocals 
Tony Kanal – bass 
Tom Dumont – guitar 
Adrian Young – drums, percussion 

Current touring members
Scheila Gonzalez – keyboards, saxophone, backing vocals 
Ijeoma Njaka – backing vocals 
Dessy Di Lauro – backing vocals 

Former touring members
Gabrial McNair – keyboards, saxophone, backing vocals

Discography

Studio albums
 Dreamcar (2017)

Singles

Promotional singles

References

External links

Alternative rock groups from California
Columbia Records artists
Musical groups established in 2016
Musical quartets
2016 establishments in California